The 1848 United States presidential election in Georgia took place on November 7, 1848, as part of the 1848 United States presidential election. Voters chose 10  representatives, or electors to the Electoral College, who voted for President and Vice President.

Georgia voted for the Whig candidate, Zachary Taylor, over Democratic candidate Lewis Cass. Taylor won Georgia by a narrow margin of 2.98%. This was the last time Georgia voted against the Democrats until 1964.

Results

References

Georgia
1848
1848 Georgia (U.S. state) elections